The Ministry of Narcotics Control ( wazarat-e- sad bab-e manshiat, Pakistan) is the Pakistan Government's federal and executive level ministry created on 4 August 2017 by Shahid Khaqan Abbasi (the then Prime Minister of Pakistan). The ministry was created out of the Ministry of Interior and Narcotics Control (now just Ministry of Interior). Its sole agency or unit is the Anti-Narcotics Force.

References

 

Federal government ministries of Pakistan